Richard de Redvers, 2nd Earl of Devon (died 1162) was Earl of Devon from 1155 until his death and was feudal baron of Plympton in Devon. He married Denise, one of the daughters and coheiresses of Reginald, Earl of Cornwall. He was High Sheriff of Devon from 1154 to 1157. He was the son of Baldwin de Redvers, 1st Earl of Devon and brother of William de Reviers, 5th Earl of Devon.

He was succeeded by his son Baldwin de Redvers, 3rd Earl of Devon (died 1188).

Footnotes

References

External links
 Redvers family
 England, Earls Created 1138-1143: Earls of Devon 1141-1262 (Redvers/Reviers)

1162 deaths
Devon, Richard de Redvers, 2nd Earl of
2
High Sheriffs of Devon
Year of birth unknown
Richard